Hassan Kassai (‎; 25 September 1928 – 14 June 2012) was a musician and player of Persian classical music. He played the ney, the traditional reed flute of Persia/Iran.

Notable students 
 Hossein Omoumi
 Masood Arbabian

Notes

External links

 Hassan Kassa'i's Official Website 

1928 births
2012 deaths
Iranian flautists
Persian classical musicians
Musicians from Isfahan
Recipients of the Order of Culture and Art
Iranian Science and Culture Hall of Fame recipients in Music
Burials at Takht-e Foulad